Bothropoma is a genus of sea snails, marine gastropod mollusks in the family Colloniidae.

Species
Species within the genus Bothropoma include:
 Bothropoma bellulum (H. Adams, 1873)
 Bothropoma decoratum Thiele, 1930
 Bothropoma isseli Thiele, 1929
 Bothropoma mundum (H. Adams, 1873)
 Bothropoma pilula (Dunker, 1860)
 Bothropoma ponsonbyi (Sowerby, 1897)
 Bothropoma rhysopoma (Barnard, 1964)

References

 Williams S.T., Karube S. & Ozawa T. (2008) Molecular systematics of Vetigastropoda: Trochidae, Turbinidae and Trochoidea redefined. Zoologica Scripta 37: 483–506

Colloniidae
Gastropod genera